Primakov is a surname, and may refer to:
Yevgeny Primakov, a Russian politician, former Prime Minister of Russia
Yevgeny Primakov Jr., a Russian politician, member of the State Duma
Vitaly Primakov, commander in Soviet Red Army
Vassily Primakov, Russian concert pianist

See also 
Primakoff